
The following is a list of Playboy Playmates of 2002.  Playboy magazine names its Playmate of the Month each month throughout the year.

January

Nicole Narain (born July 28, 1974) is a Guyanese-American model and actress. She is Playboys Playmate of the Month for January 2002 and has appeared in Playboy videos. She has also been featured in music videos and on reality TV programs.

February

Anka Romensky (born 16 September 1980) is a Ukrainian model. She is Playboy magazine's Playmate of the Month for February 2002.

March

Tina Jordan (born August 21, 1972) is an American model and radio personality. She had been romantically involved with Hugh Hefner before appearing as Playmate of the Month for March 2002.

April

Heather Carolin (born August 15, 1982) is an American model and actress, born in Harbor City, California.

May

Christi Shake (born August 22, 1980) is an American model and actress. She is of Czech, German, Polish, Swedish and Dutch ancestry. Shake is Playboy magazine's Playmate of the Month for May 2002. She has appeared in Playboy videos.

June

Michele Rogers (born May 14, 1976) is an American model and actress. She is Playboys Playmate of the Month for June 2002, and has appeared in Playboy videos. In her Playmate pictorial she said her occupation was makeup artist.

July

Lauren Anderson (born June 6, 1980; Milwaukee, Wisconsin) is an American model who was chosen as Playboys Playmate of the Month for July 2002, and has appeared in Playboy videos. Lauren was the winner of the TV special Who Wants to Be a Playboy Centerfold?, broadcast on Fox in May 2002. She appeared in the variety production "Headlights and Tailpipes" in Las Vegas at the Stardust Resort & Casino.

August

Christina Santiago (born October 15, 1981, in Chicago, Illinois) of Puerto Rican descent, is an American model and actress. She was one of three finalists of the Fox TV special Who Wants to Be a Playboy Centerfold? and was chosen as Playboys Playmate of the Month for August 2002. She then became Playmate of the Year in 2003.

September

Shallan Meiers (born September 30, 1981, in San Diego, California) is an American model. She was chosen as Playboys Playmate of the Month for September, 2002 after being a second runner-up on the Fox TV special Who Wants to Be a Playboy Centerfold? in May 2002.

October

Teri Harrison (born February 16, 1981, in Bradenton, Florida, United States) is an American model and actress. Harrison is Playboys Playmate of the Month for October 2002.   She was photographed by Stephen Wayda.

November

Serria Tawan (born September 4, 1978) is an African-American model and actress. She is Playboys Playmate of the Month for November 2002, and has appeared in numerous Playboy videos.

December

Lani Todd (born June 4, 1981) is an American model. She is Playboys Playmate of the Month for December 2002, and appeared in three Playboy videos.

See also
 List of people in Playboy 2000–2009

References

2002-related lists
2002
Playmates Of 2002